Mi. Pa. Somu is the pen name of Mi. Pa. Somasundaram (17 June 1921 – 15 January 1999) a Tamil journalist, poet, writer and musicologist from Tamil Nadu, India.

Biography
Somu was born in Meenakshipuram in Tirunelveli District. He studied Oriental Studies in Madras University and obtained the Vidwan certification awarded by it. He was a friend and contemporary of Pudhumaipithan. He won a short story competition conducted by the magazine Ananda Vikatan in 1938. He published his first collection of poems - Ilavenil - in 1946. It won a state award. He worked as the editor of the Tamil magazine Kalki from 1954 to 1956. He was the founder-editor of the monthly magazine Nanban from 1958 to 1960. He worked in All India Radio for over forty years and retired in 1981.

In 1962, he was awarded the Sahitya Akademi Award for Tamil for his travelogue Akkarai Cheemayil Arumadhangal. He has written a large number of poems, short stories, novels, non fiction essays, travelogues, plays and research articles on Music. He also contributed several entries to the Tamil Encyclopedia (Kalaikalanjiyam). He died in 1999.

Bibliography

Poetry
 Ilavenil
 Manaparavani
 Kudikattu Vezha Mugan Venba Malai

Short stories
 Kelatha Ganam
 Udhaya Kumaari
 Manjal Roja
 Manai Mangalam
 Kallarai Mogini
 Thirupugazh Samiyar

Novels
 Ravichandrika
 Kadal Kanda Kanavu
 Nandavanam
 Vennilavu Pennarasi
 Enthayum Thayum

Essays
 Karthikeyani
 Aindharuvi
 Pillayar Saatchi

References

1921 births
1999 deaths
Poets from Tamil Nadu
Recipients of the Sahitya Akademi Award in Tamil
Tamil writers
People from Tirunelveli district
20th-century Indian essayists
20th-century Indian novelists
20th-century Indian short story writers
20th-century Indian poets
Indian Tamil people
Novelists from Tamil Nadu
Journalists from Tamil Nadu